The Sons of the South – SotS (Arabic: أبناء العرقوب transliterated Abna'a Al-Orkoub) were a small and obscure Lebanese Christian terrorist faction based in southern Lebanon, active during the Lebanese Civil War.

Activities 1983-1995
Allegedly funded and trained by the Israeli Defense Forces (IDF) intelligence service (Hebrew: Aman), and believed to be a mere cover for the Guardians of the Cedars (GoC) or the South Lebanon Army (SLA), the Sons of the South were formed in 1983 and usually operated in the Jabal Amel region close to the Israeli-controlled 'Security Zone'. The group emerged in July 1984, when they kidnapped Sheikh Mohammed Hassan Amin, a prominent Shi'ite cleric of Southern Lebanon whom the IDF accused of inciting guerrilla attacks on Israeli and SLA soldiers.  Since this incident, the Sons of the South have not been held responsible for further terrorist attacks or kidnappings and it is believed that this group was disbanded around the mid-1990s, possibly by order of the Israeli authorities.  They are no longer active.

See also 
 Guardians of the Cedars
 Lebanese Civil War
 Lebanese Forces (Militia)
 Lebanese Liberation Front
 Liberation Battalion
 South Lebanon Army
 Popular Revolutionary Resistance Organization

References

Edgar O'Ballance, Civil War in Lebanon, 1975-92, Palgrave Macmillan, London 1998. 
 Rex Brynen, Sanctuary and Survival: the PLO in Lebanon, Boulder: Westview Press, Oxford 1990.  – 
Robert Fisk, Pity the Nation: Lebanon at War, London: Oxford University Press, (3rd ed. 2001).  –

Further reading

 Jean Sarkis, Histoire de la guerre du Liban, Presses Universitaires de France - PUF, Paris 1993.  (in French)
 Samir Kassir, La Guerre du Liban: De la dissension nationale au conflit régional, Éditions Karthala/CERMOC, Paris 1994.  (in French)

Israeli–Lebanese conflict
Factions in the Lebanese Civil War